The 2022 Sun Belt Conference men's basketball tournament was the postseason men's basketball tournament for Sun Belt Conference during the 2021–22 NCAA Division I men's basketball season. All tournament games were played at Pensacola Bay Center in Florida during March 3–7, 2022.  The winner, Georgia State, received the conference's automatic bid to the 2022 NCAA tournament.

Seeds 
All 12 conference teams qualified for the tournament. The top four teams received a bye into the quarterfinals.

Schedule

Bracket

References 

Tournament
Sun Belt Conference men's basketball tournament
Basketball competitions in Florida
College sports in Florida
Sports in Pensacola, Florida
Sun Belt Conference men's basketball tournament
Sun Belt Conference men's basketball tournament